Maciej Bodnar (born 7 March 1985, in Oława) is a Polish professional road racing cyclist, who currently rides for UCI ProTeam . He is the brother of fellow racing cyclist Łukasz Bodnar. Bodnar has been a team-mate of Peter Sagan throughout Sagan's career.

Major results

2006
 1st  Time trial, National Under-23 Road Championships
2007
 1st  Time trial, National Under-23 Road Championships
 1st Grand Prix Bradlo
2008
 National Road Championships
2nd Time trial
3rd Road race
 7th Overall Course de la Solidarité Olympique
2009
 1st  Time trial, National Road Championships
2010
 1st Stage 4 (TTT) Giro d'Italia
 1st Stage 1b (TTT) Settimana Internazionale di Coppi e Bartali
 National Road Championships
2nd Time trial
3rd Road race
 9th Time trial, UCI Road World Championships
2012
 1st  Time trial, National Road Championships
 3rd Overall Three Days of De Panne
2013
 1st  Time trial, National Road Championships
2014
 1st Stage 3b (ITT) Three Days of De Panne
 2nd Time trial, National Road Championships
 8th Overall Dubai Tour
2015
 1st Stage 4 Tour de Pologne
 2nd Overall Tour of Qatar
 8th Time trial, UCI Road World Championships
2016
 1st  Time trial, National Road Championships
 1st Stage 3b (ITT) Three Days of De Panne
 4th Time trial, UCI Road World Championships
 6th Time trial, Olympic Games
2017
 Tour de France
1st Stage 20 (ITT)
 Combativity award Stage 11
 2nd  Time trial, UEC European Road Championships
 3rd Time trial, National Road Championships
2018
 National Road Championships
1st  Time trial
2nd Road race
 1st Stage 1 (TTT) Czech Cycling Tour
2019
 1st  Time trial, National Road Championships
2020
 2nd Time trial, National Road Championships
2021
 1st  Time trial, National Road Championships
 7th Overall Okolo Slovenska
 8th Time trial, UEC European Road Championships
2022
 1st  Time trial, National Road Championships
 5th Time trial, UEC European Road Championships

Grand Tour general classification results timeline

References

External links

Polish male cyclists
1985 births
Living people
Cyclists at the 2012 Summer Olympics
Cyclists at the 2016 Summer Olympics
Cyclists at the 2020 Summer Olympics
Olympic cyclists of Poland
Polish Tour de France stage winners
People from Oława